Swahili, also known by its local name , is the native language of the Swahili people, who are found primarily in  Kenya, Tanzania and Mozambique (along the East African coast and adjacent litoral islands). It is a Bantu language, though Swahili has borrowed a number of words from foreign languages, particularly Arabic and Persian, but also words from Portuguese, English and German. Around forty percent of Swahili vocabulary consists of Arabic loanwords, including the name of the language (a plural adjectival form of an Arabic word meaning 'of the coast'). The loanwords date from the era of contact between Arab traders and the Bantu inhabitants of the east coast of Africa, which was also the time period when Swahili emerged as a lingua franca in the region. The number of Swahili speakers, be they native or second-language speakers, is estimated to be around  million.

Due to concerted efforts by the government of Tanzania, Swahili is one of three official languages (the others being English and French) of the East African Community (EAC) countries, namely Burundi, Democratic Republic of Congo, Kenya, Rwanda, South Sudan, Tanzania, and Uganda. It is a lingua franca of other areas in the African Great Lakes region and East and Southern Africa, including some parts of the Democratic Republic of the Congo (DRC), Malawi, Mozambique, the southern tip of Somalia, and Zambia. Swahili is also one of the working languages of the African Union and of the Southern African Development Community. The East African Community created an institution called the East African Kiswahili Commission (EAKC) which began operations in 2015. The institution currently serves as the leading body for promoting the language in the East African region, as well as for coordinating its development and usage for regional integration and sustainable development. In recent years South Africa, Botswana, Namibia, Ethiopia, and South Sudan have begun offering Swahili as a subject in schools or have developed plans to do so.

Shikomor (or Comorian), an official language in Comoros and also spoken in Mayotte, is closely related to Swahili and is sometimes considered a dialect of Swahili, although other authorities consider it a distinct language. In 2022, based on Swahili's growth as a prominent international language, the United Nations declared Swahili Language Day as 7 July to commemorate the date that Julius Nyerere adopted Swahili as a unifying language for African independence struggles.

Classification
Swahili is a Bantu language of the Sabaki branch. In Guthrie's geographic classification, Swahili is in Bantu zone G, whereas the other Sabaki languages are in zone E70, commonly under the name Nyika. Historical linguists consider the Arabic influence on Swahili to be significant, since it takes around 40% of its vocabulary directly from Arabic, and was initially spread by Arab slave traders along East Africa's coast.

History

Etymology
The origin of the word Swahili is its phonetic equivalent in Arabic:

Origin
The core of the Swahili language originates in Bantu languages of the coast of East Africa. Much of Swahili's Bantu vocabulary has cognates in the Pokomo, Taita, and Mijikenda languages and, to a lesser extent, other East African Bantu languages. While opinions vary on the specifics, it has been historically purported that around 16-20% of the Swahili vocabulary is derived from loan words, the vast majority Arabic, but also other contributing languages, including Persian, Hindustani, Portuguese, and Malay.

Omani Arabic is the source of most Arabic loanwords in Swahili. In the text "Early Swahili History Reconsidered", however, Thomas Spear noted that Swahili retains a large amount of grammar, vocabulary, and sounds inherited from the Sabaki language. In fact, while taking account of daily vocabulary, using lists of one hundred words, 72–91% were inherited from the Sabaki language (which is reported as a parent language) whereas 4–17% were loan words from other African languages. Only 2–8% were from non-African languages, and Arabic loan words constituted a fraction of that. According to other sources, around 40% of the Swahili vocabulary comes from Arabic. What also remained unconsidered was that a good number of the borrowed terms had Bantu equivalents. The preferred use of Arabic loan words is prevalent along the coast, where local people, in a cultural show of proximity to, or descent from Arab culture, would rather use loan words, whereas the people in the interior tend to use the Bantu equivalents. It was originally written in Arabic script.

The earliest known documents written in Swahili are letters written in Kilwa, Tanzania, in 1711 in the Arabic script that were sent to the Portuguese of Mozambique and their local allies. The original letters are preserved in the Historical Archives of Goa, India.

Colonial period

Various colonial powers that ruled on the coast of East Africa played a role in the growth and spread of Swahili. With the arrival of the Arabs in East Africa, they used Swahili as a language of trade as well as for teaching Islam to the local Bantu peoples. This resulted in Swahili first being written in the Arabic alphabet. The later contact with the Portuguese resulted in the increase of vocabulary of the Swahili language. The language was formalised in an institutional level when the Germans took over after the Berlin conference. After seeing there was already a widespread language, the Germans formalised it as the official language to be used in schools. Thus schools in Swahili are called Shule (from German ) in government, trade and the court system. With the Germans controlling the major Swahili-speaking region in East Africa, they changed the alphabet system from Arabic to Latin. After the First World War, Britain took over German East Africa, where they found Swahili rooted in most areas, not just the coastal regions. The British decided to formalise it as the language to be used across the East African region (although in British East Africa [Kenya and Uganda] most areas used English and various Nilotic and other Bantu languages while Swahili was mostly restricted to the coast). In June 1928, an inter-territorial conference attended by representatives of Kenya, Tanganyika, Uganda, and Zanzibar took place in Mombasa. The Zanzibar dialect was chosen as standard Swahili for those areas, and the standard orthography for Swahili was adopted.

Current status
Swahili has become a second language spoken by tens of millions of people in the four African Great Lakes countries (Kenya, DRC, Uganda, and Tanzania), where it is an official or national language. It is also the first language for many people in Tanzania, especially in the coastal regions of Tanga, Pwani, Dar es Salaam, Mtwara and Lindi. In the inner regions of Tanzania, Swahili is spoken with an accent influenced by other local languages and dialects. There, it is a first language for most of the people who are born in the cities, whilst being spoken as a second language in rural areas. Swahili and closely related languages are spoken by relatively small numbers of people in Burundi, Comoros, Malawi, Mozambique, Zambia and Rwanda. The language was still understood in the southern ports of the Red Sea in the 20th century. The East African Community created an institution called the East African Kiswahili Commission (EAKC) which began operations in 2015. The institution currently serves as the leading body for promoting the language in the East African region, as well as for coordinating its development and usage for regional integration and sustainable development.

Swahili is among the first languages in Africa for which language technology applications have been developed. Arvi Hurskainen is one of the early developers. The applications include a spelling checker, part-of-speech tagging, a language learning software, an analysed Swahili text corpus of 25 million words, an electronic dictionary, and machine translation between Swahili and English. The development of language technology also strengthens the position of Swahili as a modern medium of communication. Furthermore, Swahili Wikipedia is among one of the few Wikipedias in an African language that features a fair amount of contributors and articles.

Tanzania
The widespread use of Swahili as a national language in Tanzania came after Tanganyika gained independence in 1961 and the government decided that it would be used as a language to unify the new nation. This saw the use of Swahili in all levels of government, trade, art as well as schools in which primary school children are taught in Swahili, before switching to English (medium of instruction) in secondary schools (although Swahili is still taught as an independent subject).
After Tanganyika and Zanzibar unification in 1964, Taasisi ya Uchunguzi wa Kiswahili (TUKI, Institute of Swahili Research) was created from the Interterritorial Language Committee. In 1970 TUKI was merged with the University of Dar es Salaam, while Baraza la Kiswahili la Taifa (BAKITA) was formed. BAKITA is an organisation dedicated to the development and advocacy of Swahili as a means of national integration in Tanzania. Key activities mandated for the organization include creating a healthy atmosphere for the development of Swahili, encouraging use of the language in government and business functions, coordinating activities of other organizations involved with Swahili, standardizing the language. BAKITA vision are: "1.To efficiently manage and coordinate the development and use of Kiswahili in Tanzania 2.To participate fully and effectively in promoting Swahili in East Africa, Africa and the entire world over". Although other bodies and agencies can propose new vocabularies, BAKITA is the only organisation that can approve its usage in the Swahili language.

Kenya
In Kenya, Kiswahili has been the national language since 1964 and is official since 2010. Chama cha Kiswahili cha Taifa (CHAKITA) was established in 1998 to research and promote Kiswahili language in Kenya. Kiswahili is a compulsory subject in all Kenyan primary and secondary schools.

Uganda
Uganda adopted Kiswahili as the official language in 2022, and also made it compulsory across primary and secondary schools in the country.

Somalia
The Swahili language is not widespread in Somalia and has no official status nationally or regionally. Dialects of Swahili are spoken by some ethnic minorities on the Bajuni islands in the form of Kibajuni on the southern tip of the country and in the town of Brava in the form of Chimwiini; both contain a significant amount of Somali and Italian loanwords. Standard Swahili is generally only spoken by Somali nationals who have resided in Kenya and subsequently returned to Somalia. Lastly, a closely related language Mushunguli (also known as Zigula, Zigua, or Chizigua) is spoken by some of the Somali Bantu ethnic minority mostly living in the Jubba Valley. It is classified as a Northeast Coast Bantu language as Swahili is and has some intelligibility with Swahili.

Religious and political identity

Religion
Swahili played a major role in spreading both Christianity and Islam in East Africa. From their arrival in East Africa, Arabs brought Islam and set up madrasas, where they used Swahili to teach Islam to the natives. As the Arab presence grew, more and more natives were converted to Islam and were taught using the Swahili language.

From the arrival of Europeans in East Africa, Christianity was introduced to the region. While the Arabs were mostly based in the coastal areas, European missionaries went further inland spreading Christianity. As the first missionary posts in East Africa were in the coastal areas, missionaries picked up Swahili and used it to spread Christianity, since it contained many similarities with other indigenous languages in the region.

Politics
During the struggle for Tanganyika independence, the Tanganyika African National Union used Swahili as a language of mass organisation and political movement. This included publishing pamphlets and radio broadcasts to rally the people to fight for independence. After gaining independence, Swahili was adopted as the national language. To this day, Tanzanians carry a sense of pride when it comes to Swahili, especially when it is used to unite over 120 tribes across Tanzania. Swahili was used to strengthen solidarity within the nation, and remains to be a key identity of the Tanzanian people.

Phonology

Vowels
According to Ellen Contini-Morava, vowels are never reduced, regardless of stress. However, according to Edgar Polomé, these five phonemes can vary in pronunciation. E is also commonly pronounced as mid-position after w. Swahili vowels can be long; these are written as two vowels (example: , meaning "sheep"). This is due to a historical process in which the L became deleted between the second last and last vowel of a word (e.g. "sheep" was originally pronounced kondolo, which survives in certain dialects). However, these long vowels are not considered to be phonemic. A similar process exists in Zulu.

Consonants

Some dialects of Swahili may also have the aspirated phonemes  though they are unmarked in Swahili's orthography. Multiple studies favour classifying prenasalization as consonant clusters, not as separate phonemes. Historically, nasalization has been lost before voiceless consonants, and subsequently the voiced consonants have devoiced, though they are still written mb, nd etc. The /r/ phoneme is realised as either a short trill  or more commonly as a single tap  by most speakers.  exists in free variation with h, and is only distinguished by some speakers. In some Arabic loans (nouns, verbs, adjectives), emphasis or intensity is expressed by reproducing the original emphatic consonants  and the uvular , or lengthening a vowel, where aspiration would be used in inherited Bantu words.

Orthography

Swahili is now written in the Latin alphabet. There are a few digraphs for native sounds, ch, sh, ng and ny; q and x are not used, c is not used apart from the digraph ch, unassimilated English loans and, occasionally, as a substitute for k in advertisements. There are also several digraphs for Arabic sounds, which many speakers outside of ethnic Swahili areas have trouble differentiating.

The language used to be written in the Ajami script, which is an Arabic script. Unlike other adaptations of the Arabic script for other languages, relatively little accommodation was made for Swahili. There were also differences in orthographic conventions between cities and authors and over the centuries, some quite precise but others different enough to cause difficulties with intelligibility.

Several Swahili consonants do not have equivalents in Arabic, and for them, often no special letters were created unlike other languages. Instead, the closest Arabic sound is substituted. Not only did that mean that one letter often stands for more than one sound, but also writers made different choices of which consonant to substitute. Below are some of the equivalents between Arabic Swahili and Roman Swahili:

Although it is not found in Standard Swahili today, there is a distinction between dental and alveolar consonants in some dialects, which is reflected in some orthographies, for example in   'to meet' vs.   'to be satisfied'. A k with the dots of y, was used for ch in some conventions; ky being historically and even contemporaneously a more accurate transcription than Roman ch.

Grammar

Noun classes 
Swahili nouns are separable into classes, which are roughly analogous to genders in other languages. In Swahili, prefixes mark groups of similar objects:  marks single human beings ( 'child'),  marks multiple humans ( 'children'),  marks abstract nouns ( 'childhood'), and so on. And just as adjectives and pronouns must agree with the gender of nouns in some languages with grammatical gender, so in Swahili adjectives, pronouns and even verbs must agree with nouns. This is a characteristic feature of all the Bantu languages.

Semantic motivation
The ki-/vi- class historically consisted of two separate genders, artefacts (Bantu class 7/8, utensils and hand tools mostly) and diminutives (Bantu class 12/13), which were conflated at a stage ancestral to Swahili. Examples of the former are kisu "knife", kiti "chair" (from mti "tree, wood"), chombo "vessel" (a contraction of ki-ombo). Examples of the latter are kitoto "infant", from mtoto "child"; kitawi "frond", from tawi "branch"; and chumba (ki-umba) "room", from nyumba "house". It is the diminutive sense that has been furthest extended. An extension common to diminutives in many languages is approximation and resemblance (having a 'little bit' of some characteristic, like -y or -ish in English). For example, there is kijani "green", from jani "leaf" (compare English 'leafy'), kichaka "bush" from chaka "clump", and kivuli "shadow" from uvuli "shade". A 'little bit' of a verb would be an instance of an action, and such instantiations (usually not very active ones) are found: kifo "death", from the verb -fa "to die"; kiota "nest" from -ota "to brood"; chakula "food" from kula "to eat"; kivuko "a ford, a pass" from -vuka "to cross"; and kilimia "the Pleiades", from -limia "to farm with", from its role in guiding planting. A resemblance, or being a bit like something, implies marginal status in a category, so things that are marginal examples of their class may take the ki-/vi- prefixes. One example is chura (ki-ura) "frog", which is only half terrestrial and therefore is marginal as an animal. This extension may account for disabilities as well: kilema "a cripple", kipofu "a blind person", kiziwi "a deaf person". Finally, diminutives often denote contempt, and contempt is sometimes expressed against things that are dangerous. This might be the historical explanation for kifaru "rhinoceros", kingugwa "spotted hyena", and kiboko "hippopotamus" (perhaps originally meaning "stubby legs").

Another class with broad semantic extension is the m-/mi- class (Bantu classes 3/4). This is often called the 'tree' class, because mti, miti "tree(s)" is the prototypical example. However, it seems to cover vital entities neither human nor typical animals: trees and other plants, such as mwitu 'forest' and mtama 'millet' (and from there, things made from plants, like mkeka 'mat'); supernatural and natural forces, such as mwezi 'moon', mlima 'mountain', mto 'river'; active things, such as moto 'fire', including active body parts (moyo 'heart', mkono 'hand, arm'); and human groups, which are vital but not themselves human, such as mji 'village', and, by analogy, mzinga 'beehive/cannon'. From the central idea of tree, which is thin, tall, and spreading, comes an extension to other long or extended things or parts of things, such as mwavuli 'umbrella', moshi 'smoke', msumari 'nail'; and from activity there even come active instantiations of verbs, such as mfuo "metal forging", from -fua "to forge", or mlio "a sound", from -lia "to make a sound". Words may be connected to their class by more than one metaphor. For example, mkono is an active body part, and mto is an active natural force, but they are also both long and thin. Things with a trajectory, such as mpaka 'border' and mwendo 'journey', are classified with long thin things, as in many other languages with noun classes. This may be further extended to anything dealing with time, such as mwaka 'year' and perhaps mshahara 'wages'. Animals exceptional in some way and so not easily fitting in the other classes may be placed in this class.

The other classes have foundations that may at first seem similarly counterintuitive. In short,
Classes 1–2 include most words for people: kin terms, professions, ethnicities, etc., including translations of most English words ending in -er. They include a couple of generic words for animals: mnyama 'beast', mdudu 'bug'.
Classes 5–6 have a broad semantic range of groups, expanses, and augmentatives. Although interrelated, it is easier to illustrate if broken down:
Augmentatives, such as joka 'serpent' from nyoka 'snake', lead to titles and other terms of respect (the opposite of diminutives, which lead to terms of contempt): Bwana 'Sir', shangazi 'aunt', fundi 'craftsman', kadhi 'judge'
Expanses: ziwa 'lake', bonde 'valley', taifa 'country', anga 'sky'
from this, mass nouns: maji 'water', vumbi 'dust' (and other liquids and fine particulates that may cover broad expanses), kaa 'charcoal', mali 'wealth', maridhawa 'abundance'
Collectives: kundi 'group', kabila 'language/ethnic group', jeshi 'army', daraja ' stairs', manyoya 'fur, feathers', mapesa 'small change', manyasi 'weeds', jongoo 'millipede' (large set of legs), marimba 'xylophone' (large set of keys)
from this, individual things found in groups: jiwe 'stone', tawi 'branch', ua 'flower', tunda 'fruit' (also the names of most fruits), yai 'egg', mapacha 'twins', jino 'tooth', tumbo 'stomach' (cf. English "guts"), and paired body parts such as jicho 'eye', bawa 'wing', etc.
also collective or dialogic actions, which occur among groups of people: neno 'a word', from kunena 'to speak' (and by extension, mental verbal processes: wazo 'thought', maana 'meaning'); pigo 'a stroke, blow', from kupiga 'to hit'; gomvi 'a quarrel', shauri 'advice, plan', kosa 'mistake', jambo 'affair', penzi 'love', jibu 'answer', agano 'promise', malipo 'payment'
From pairing, reproduction is suggested as another extension (fruit, egg, testicle, flower, twins, etc.), but these generally duplicate one or more of the subcategories above
Classes 9–10 are used for most typical animals: ndege 'bird', samaki 'fish', and the specific names of typical beasts, birds, and bugs. However, this is the 'other' class, for words not fitting well elsewhere, and about half of the class 9–10 nouns are foreign loanwords. Loans may be classified as 9–10 because they lack the prefixes inherent in other classes, and most native class 9–10 nouns have no prefix. Thus they do not form a coherent semantic class, though there are still semantic extensions from individual words.
Class 11 (which takes class 10 for the plural) are mostly nouns with an "extended outline shape", in either one dimension or two:
mass nouns that are generally localized rather than covering vast expanses: uji 'porridge', wali 'cooked rice'
broad: ukuta 'wall', ukucha 'fingernail', upande 'side' (≈ ubavu 'rib'), wavu 'net', wayo 'sole, footprint', ua 'fence, yard', uteo 'winnowing basket'
long: utambi 'wick', utepe 'stripe', uta 'bow', ubavu 'rib', ufa 'crack', unywele 'a hair'
from 'a hair', singulatives of nouns, which are often class 6 ('collectives') in the plural: unyoya 'a feather', uvumbi 'a mote of dust', ushanga 'a bead'.
Class 14 are abstractions, such as utoto 'childhood' (from mtoto 'a child') and have no plural. They have the same prefixes and concord as class 11, except optionally for adjectival concord.
Class 15 are verbal infinitives.
Classes 16–18 are locatives. The Bantu nouns of these classes have been lost; the only permanent member is the Arabic loan mahali 'place(s)', but in Mombasa Swahili, the old prefixes survive: pahali 'place', mwahali 'places'. However, any noun with the locative suffix -ni takes class 16–18 agreement. The distinction between them is that class 16 agreement is used if the location is intended to be definite ("at"), class 17 if indefinite ("around") or involves motion ("to, toward"), and class 18 if it involves containment ("within"): mahali pazuri 'a good spot', mahali kuzuri 'a nice area', mahali muzuri (it's nice in there).

Borrowing
Borrowings may or may not be given a prefix corresponding to the semantic class they fall in. For example, Arabic  dūd ("bug, insect") was borrowed as mdudu, plural wadudu, with the class 1/2 prefixes m- and wa-, but Arabic  fulūs ("fish scales", plural of  fals) and English sloth were borrowed as simply fulusi ("mahi-mahi" fish) and slothi ("sloth"), with no prefix associated with animals (whether those of class 9/10 or 1/2).

In the process of naturalization of borrowings within Swahili, loanwords are often reinterpreted, or reanalysed, as if they already contain a Swahili class prefix. In such cases the interpreted prefix is changed with the usual rules. Consider the following loanwords from Arabic:
The Swahili word for "book", kitabu, is borrowed from Arabic  kitāb(un) "book" (plural  kutub; from the Arabic root k.t.b. "write"). However, the Swahili plural form of this word ("books") is vitabu, following Bantu grammar in which the ki- of kitabu is reanalysed (reinterpreted) as a nominal class prefix whose plural is vi- (class 7/8). 
Arabic  muʿallim(un) ("teacher", plural  muʿallimīna) was interpreted as having the mw- prefix of class 1, and so became mwalimu, plural walimu. 
Arabic  madrasa school, even though it is singular in Arabic (with plural  madāris), was reinterpreted as a class 6 plural madarasa, receiving the singular form darasa.

Similarly, English wire and Arabic  waqt ("time") were interpreted as having the class 11 prevocalic prefix w-, and became waya and wakati with plural nyaya and nyakati respectively.

Agreement

Swahili phrases agree with nouns in a system of concord but, if the noun refers to a human, they accord with noun classes 1–2 regardless of their noun class. Verbs agree with the noun class of their subjects and objects; adjectives, prepositions and demonstratives agree with the noun class of their nouns. In Standard Swahili (Kiswahili sanifu), based on the dialect spoken in Zanzibar, the system is rather complex; however, it is drastically simplified in many local variants where Swahili is not a native language, such as in Nairobi. In non-native Swahili, concord reflects only animacy: human subjects and objects trigger a-, wa- and m-, wa- in verbal concord, while non-human subjects and objects of whatever class trigger i-, zi-. Infinitives vary between standard ku- and reduced i-. ("Of" is animate wa and inanimate ya, za.)

In Standard Swahili, human subjects and objects of whatever class trigger animacy concord in a-, wa- and m-, wa-, and non-human subjects and objects trigger a variety of gender-concord prefixes.

Dialects and closely related languages
This list is based on Swahili and Sabaki: a linguistic history.

Dialects
Modern standard Swahili is based on Kiunguja, the dialect spoken in Zanzibar City, but there are numerous dialects of Swahili, some of which are mutually unintelligible, such as the following:

Old dialects
Maho (2009) considers these to be distinct languages:
Kimwani is spoken in the Kerimba Islands and northern coastal Mozambique.
Chimwiini is spoken by the ethnic minorities in and around the town of Barawa on the southern coast of Somalia.
Kibajuni is spoken by the Bajuni minority ethnic group on the coast and islands on both sides of the Somali–Kenyan border and in the Bajuni Islands (the northern part of the Lamu archipelago) and is also called Kitikuu and Kigunya.
Socotra Swahili (extinct)
Sidi, in Gujarat (extinct)
The rest of the dialects are divided by him into two groups:
Mombasa–Lamu Swahili
Lamu
 The dialects of the Lamu group (especially Kiamu, Kipate, Kingozi) are the linguistic base of the oldest (c.1600 CE) Swahili manuscripts and poems that reached us. They are sometimes described as "literary" dialects but they were also used for everyday life and are still spoken today except Kingozi.
Kiamu is spoken in and around the island of Lamu (Amu) and have an important corpus of classical poems of the 18st and 19st centuries written in Arabic script (Kiajemi).
Kipate is a local dialect of Pate Island, considered to be closest to the original dialect of Kingozi. It has also an important classical corpus of poems from the 18st and 19st centuries.
Kingozi is an extinct dialect spoken on the Indian Ocean coast between Lamu and Somalia and is sometimes still used in poetry. It is often considered the source of Swahili. Academic theories about Kingozi as an old literary dialect are conflicting. It's sometimes linked to the epics of Liongo. For Sacleux, it's and old and "an exclusively literary, arcane dialect". It varies depending on the authors whose will to return to a pure form of the old language make them use Kigunya mainly (Kipate is a subdialect of Kigunya) and secondarily Kiamu and Kimvita. Knappert, on the contrary, states the existence of a literary koine in the XVIIIst century based on the Kingozi as a prestigious and widespread dialect. The 2009 New Updated Guthrie List, a referential classification of the Bantu languages, considers kiOzi as a dialect in itself. It's not the ancestor language of Kiswahili but a member of the Lamu group (code G42a) with Kiamu, Kipate and Kisiu. This brief overview indicates that the state of research is fragmented and uncertain on the history of the kingozi.   
Mombasa
Chijomvu is a subdialect of the Mombasa area.
Kimvita is the major dialect of Mombasa (also known as "Mvita", which means "war", in reference to the many wars which were fought over it, the other major dialect alongside Kiunguja. It has an important classical corpus written in Arabic script from the 18st and 19st century.
Kingare is the subdialect of the Mombasa area.
Kimrima is spoken around Pangani, Vanga, Dar es Salaam, Rufiji and Mafia Island.
Kiunguja is spoken in Zanzibar City and environs on Unguja (Zanzibar) Island. Kitumbatu (Pemba) dialects occupy the bulk of the island.
Mambrui, Malindi
Chichifundi, a dialect of the southern Kenya coast.
Chwaka
Kivumba, a dialect of the southern Kenya coast.
Nosse Be (Madagascar)
Pemba Swahili
Kipemba is a local dialect of the Pemba Island.
Kitumbatu and Kimakunduchi are the countryside dialects of the island of Zanzibar. Kimakunduchi is a recent renaming of "Kihadimu"; the old name means "serf" and so is considered pejorative.
Makunduchi
Mafia, Mbwera
Kilwa (extinct)
Kimgao used to be spoken around Kilwa District and to the south.

Maho includes the various Comorian dialects as a third group. Most other authorities consider Comorian to be a Sabaki language, distinct from Swahili.

Other regions
In Somalia, where the Afroasiatic Somali language predominates, a variant of Swahili referred to as Chimwiini (also known as Chimbalazi) is spoken along the Benadir coast by the Bravanese people. Another Swahili dialect known as Kibajuni also serves as the mother tongue of the Bajuni minority ethnic group, which lives in the tiny Bajuni Islands as well as the southern Kismayo region.

In Oman, there are an estimated  people who speak Swahili as of 2020. Most are descendants of those repatriated after the fall of the Sultanate of Zanzibar.

Pidgins and creoles
There are Swahili-based slangs, pidgins and creoles:

Swahili poets
 Shaaban bin Robert (1909-1962), Tanzanian poet, author, and essayist
 Euphrase Kezilahabi (1944-2020), Tanzanian novelist, poet, and scholar
 Mathias E. Mnyampala (1917-1969), Tanzanian writer, lawyer, and poet
 Tumi Molekane (b. 1981), South African rapper and poet
 Fadhy Mtanga (b. 1981), Tanzanian creative writer, photographer, graphic designer
 Christopher Mwashinga (b. 1965), Tanzanian author and poet

Swahili sayings

Two sayings with the same literal meaning of Where elephants fight, the grass is trampled or figuratively speaking, when those with power fight, it is those below them who suffer:

See also

Mandombe script
Swahili literature
UCLA Language Materials Project
Languages of Africa

References

Sources
Ashton, E. O. 1947. Swahili Grammar: Including intonation. Essex: Longman House. .
Irele, Abiola and Biodun Jeyifo. 2010. The Oxford encyclopedia of African thought, Volume 1. New York, NY: Oxford University Press. 
Blommaert, Jan. 2003. Situating Language Rights: English and Swahili in Tanzania Revisited  (sociolinguistic developments in Tanzanian Swahili) – Working Papers in Urban Language & Literacies, paper 23, Ghent University.
 Brock-Utne, Birgit. 2001. "Education for All – in Whose Language?" Oxford Review of Education, 27(1): 115–134. doi:10.1080/03054980125577. S2CID 144457326.
Chiraghdin, Shihabuddin and Mathias E. Mnyampala. 1977. Historia ya Kiswahili. Oxford University Press. Eastern Africa.
Contini-Morava, Ellen. 1994. Noun Classification in Swahili.
Lambert, H.E. 1956. Chi-Chifundi: A Dialect of the Southern Kenya Coast. (Kampala)
Lambert, H.E. 1957. Ki-Vumba: A Dialect of the Southern Kenya Coast. (Kampala)
Lambert, H.E. 1958. Chi-Jomvu and ki-Ngare: Subdialects of the Mombasa Area. (Kampala)
Marshad, Hassan A. Kiswahili au Kiingereza (Nchini Kenya). Jomo Kenyatta Foundation. Nairobi 1993. .
Mugane, John A. 2015. The Story of Swahili. Athenns, OH: Ohio University Press. .
Nurse, Derek, and Hinnebusch, Thomas J. Swahili and Sabaki: a linguistic history. 1993. Series: University of California Publications in Linguistics, v. 121.
Ogechi, Nathan Oyori: "On language rights in Kenya  (on the legal position of Swahili in Kenya)", in: Nordic Journal of African Studies 12(3): 277–295 (2003)
Prins, A.H.J. 1961. "The Swahili-Speaking Peoples of Zanzibar and the East African Coast (Arabs, Shirazi and Swahili)". Ethnographic Survey of Africa, edited by Daryll Forde. London: International African Institute.
Prins, A.H.J. 1970. A Swahili Nautical Dictionary. Preliminary Studies in Swahili Lexicon – 1. Dar es Salaam.
Sakai, Yuko. 2020. Swahili Syntax Tree Diagram: Based on Universal Sentence Structure. Createspace. 
Whiteley, Wilfred. 1969. Swahili: the rise of a national language. London: Methuen. Series: Studies in African History.

External links
UCLA report on Swahili
John Ogwana (2001) Swahili Yesterday, Today and Tomorrow: Factors of Its Development and Expansion
List of Swahili Dictionaries
 

 Nasema, a method of writing Swahili with the N'Ko script

 
Swahili culture
Languages written in Latin script
Northeast Coast Bantu languages
Non-tonal languages in tonal families
Agglutinative languages
Languages of Kenya
Languages of Burundi
Languages of Uganda
Languages of Tanzania
Languages of the Democratic Republic of the Congo
Languages of the African diaspora
Articles containing video clips